Norwich Township is one of the nineteen townships of Huron County, Ohio, United States. As of the 2010 census the population of the township was 1,070.

Geography
Located on the western edge of the county, it borders the following townships:
Sherman Township - north
Peru Township - northeast corner
Greenfield Township - east
New Haven Township - southeast corner
Richmond Township - south
Venice Township, Seneca County - southwest
Reed Township, Seneca County - west

A small part of the city of Willard borders the southeast corner of Norwich Township.

Name and history
Norwich Township was organized in 1827. It was named after Norwich, Connecticut.
Statewide, the only other Norwich Township is located in Franklin County.

Government
The township is governed by a three-member board of trustees, who are elected in November of odd-numbered years to a four-year term beginning on the following January 1. Two are elected in the year after the presidential election and one is elected in the year before it. There is also an elected township fiscal officer, who serves a four-year term beginning on April 1 of the year after the election, which is held in November of the year before the presidential election. Vacancies in the fiscal officership or on the board of trustees are filled by the remaining trustees.

References

External links
County website

Townships in Huron County, Ohio
Townships in Ohio